Wakefield Warriors may refer to:
 Athletic teams and programs of Wakefield Memorial High School (Massachusetts)
 Athletic teams and programs of Wakefield High School (Arlington County, Virginia)